Waukon is an unincorporated community in Lincoln County, in the U.S. state of Washington.

History
Waukon had its start when the Spokane, Portland & Seattle Railway was extended to that point. A post office called Waukon was established in 1893, and remained in operation until 1973.

References

Unincorporated communities in Lincoln County, Washington
Unincorporated communities in Washington (state)